The , was one of four armored divisions of the Imperial Japanese Army in World War II.

History
The 3rd Tank Division was raised in Inner Mongolia in 1942 as part of the Japanese Northern China Area Army under the overall aegis of the Mongolia Garrison Army.

Initially tasked primarily with border patrol of Manchukuo's western frontier with the Soviet Union, from April 1944, it participated in Operation Ichi-Go in northern China against the National Revolutionary Army of the Republic of China. The two primary goals of Ichi-go were to open a land route to French Indochina, and capture air bases in southeast China from which American bombers were attacking the Japanese homeland and shipping.

The 3rd Tank Division’s IJA 8th Armored Regiment (formerly based in Mukden) was detached in June 1944, and transferred to the control of the Japanese Eighth Area Army in Rabaul.

The IJA 12th Armored Regiment, formerly based in Taiyuan, was withdrawn to bolster the defenses of Seoul in Korea towards the closing stages of the war and as part of the Japanese Seventeenth Area Army was in combat against the Soviet Red Army’s invasion of Manchuria.

The IJA 13th Armored Regiment, normally based in Hankou was withdrawn to Tianjin in 1944, and ended the war in Changsha. The IJA 17th Armored Regiment ended the war in Tianjin.

The 3rd Tank Division was officially demobilized in September 1945 with the rest of the Imperial Japanese Army.

Commanding officer

See also
 List of Japanese armored divisions

Notes

References

External links
Taki's Imperial Japanese Army Page - Akira Takizawa

Military units and formations established in 1942
Military units and formations disestablished in 1945
1942 establishments in Japan
1945 disestablishments in Japan
Tank Divisions of Japan